Nathembo, or Sakati (Sangaji), is a Bantu language spoken by the Makua people of Mozambique.

References

Makua languages
Languages of Mozambique